Pavieasia is a small genus of tree species in the family Sapindaceae. Records are mostly from southern China and Vietnam.

Species
Plants of the World Online lists:
 Pavieasia anamensis - type speies
 Pavieasia kwangsiensis

References

External links

Sapindaceae
Sapindaceae genera
Flora of Indo-China